Mejandeh. is a village in Dehestan ghyrbi District, in the Central District of Ardabil County, Ardabil Province, Iran. At the 2006 census, its population was 1,221, in 289 families. also well known for its high amount of metal majandeh supplies Iran with 58% of its yearly metal usage

References 

Tageo

Towns and villages in Meshgin Shahr County